A head on a spike (also described as a head on a pike, a head on a stake, or a head on a spear) is a severed head that has been vertically impaled for display.  This has been a custom in a number of cultures, typically either as part of a criminal penalty following execution or as a war trophy following a violent conflict. The symbolic value may change over time. It may give a warning to spectators. The head may be a human head or an animal head.

History
The earliest known archeological evidence for mounting heads on stakes has been identified in Sweden, at a Mesolithic site in Kanaljorden, in the floor of a dried lake, dating to 8,000 years ago.  There, archeologists recovered human crania with the remnants of wooden stakes still in place within the two crania.  The crania exhibited evidence of blunt force trauma that looked to have resulted from a violent confrontation.  Archeologists interpreted the wooden stakes as evidence that the heads had been mounted for display by members of the Swedish Mesolithic hunter-gatherer culture.

In England, the heads of criminals, especially those convicted of treason, were mounted for display on London Bridge from about 1300 until about 1660.  Heads were usually dipped in tar to slow down the decomposition process.  Criminal punishment was sometimes posthumous, as the body of Oliver Cromwell was exhumed so that it could be hanged, drawn, and quartered, and his head was mounted on a spike and displayed for 30 years.

Noted examples 
 William Wallace (c. 1270–1305)
 Simon Fraser (d. 1306)
 Jack Cade (c. 1420–1450)
 Richard of York (1411–1460)
 Edmund, Earl of Rutland (1443-1460)
 John Fisher (1469-1535)
 Thomas More (1478–1535)
 Thomas Cromwell (c. 1485–1540)
 Richard Gwyn (ca.1537-1584)
 Muiris Mac Ionrachtaigh (d.1585)
 Cahir O'Doherty (1587-1608)
 Oliver Cromwell (1599–1658)
 Redmond O'Hanlon (c. 1640 – 1681)
 Éamonn an Chnoic (d.c.1724)
 Jacques de Flesselles (1730–1789)
 Bernard-René Jourdan de Launay (1740–1789)
 Staker Wallace (1733–1798)
 John Murphy (1753–1798)
 Vela Peeva (1922–1944)

Gallery

See also 
 Decapitation
 Mouting points and synonyms:
 spike, stake, pike, pole, pale, picket
 Battlefield Cross, a symbolic replacement of a cross made up of the soldier's rifle stuck into the ground with helmet on top
 London Bridge
 Impalement, in which the object is alive at the time of penetration

References

Bibliography
 

 
 

Warning systems